Photonic molecules are a theoretical natural form of matter which can also be made artificially in which photons bind together to form "molecules". They were first predicted in 2007. Photonic molecules are formed when individual (massless) photons "interact with each other so strongly that they act as though they have mass". In an alternative definition (which is not equivalent), photons confined to two or more coupled optical cavities also reproduce the physics of interacting atomic energy levels, and have been termed as photonic molecules.

Researchers drew analogies between the phenomenon and the fictional "lightsaber" from Star Wars.

Construction 
Gaseous rubidium atoms were pumped into a vacuum chamber. The cloud was cooled using lasers to just a few degrees above absolute zero. Using weak laser pulses, small numbers of photons were fired into the cloud.

As the photons entered the cloud, their energy excited atoms along their path, causing them to lose speed. Inside the cloud medium, the photons dispersively coupled to strongly interacting atoms in highly excited Rydberg states. This caused the photons to behave as massive particles with strong mutual attraction (photon molecules). Eventually the photons exited the cloud together as normal photons (often entangled in pairs).

The effect is caused by a so-called Rydberg blockade, which, in the presence of one excited atom, prevents nearby atoms from being excited to the same degree. In this case, as two photons enter the atomic cloud, the first excites an atom, annihilating itself in the interaction, but the transmitted energy must move forward inside the excited atom before the second photon can excite nearby atoms. In effect the two photons push and pull each other through the cloud as their energy is passed from one atom to the next, forcing them to interact. This photonic interaction is mediated by the electromagnetic interaction between photons and atoms.

Possible applications 
The interaction of the photons suggests that the effect could be employed to build a system that can preserve quantum information, and process it using quantum logic operations.

The system could also be useful in classical computing, given the much-lower power required to manipulate photons than electrons.

It may be possible to arrange the photonic molecules in such a way within the medium that they form larger two-dimensional structures (similar to drawings).

Interacting optical cavities as photonic molecules 
The term photonic molecule has been also used since 1998 for an unrelated phenomenon involving electromagnetically-interacting optical microcavities. The properties of quantized confined photon states in optical micro- and nanocavities are very similar to those of confined electron states in atoms. Owing to this similarity, optical microcavities can be termed ‘photonic atoms’. Taking this analogy even further, a cluster of several mutually-coupled photonic atoms forms a photonic molecule. When individual photonic atoms are brought into close proximity, their optical modes interact and give rise to a spectrum of hybridized super-modes of photonic molecules. This is very similar to what happens when two isolated systems are coupled, like two hydrogen atomic orbitals coming together to form the bonding and antibonding orbitals of the hydrogen molecule, which are hybridized super-modes of the total coupled system.

"A micrometer-sized piece of semiconductor can trap photons inside it in such a way that they act like electrons in an atom. Now the 21 September PRL describes a way to link two of these “photonic atoms” together. The result of such a close relationship is a “photonic molecule,” whose optical modes bear a strong resemblance to the electronic states of a diatomic molecule like hydrogen." "Photonic molecules, named by analogy with chemical molecules, are clusters of closely located electromagnetically interacting microcavities or “photonic atoms”." "Optically coupled microcavities have emerged as photonic structures with promising properties for investigation of fundamental science as well as for applications."

The first photonic realization of the two-level system of a photonic molecule was by Spreew et al., who used optical fibers to realize a ring resonator, although they did not use the term "photonic molecule". The two modes forming the molecule could then be the polarization modes of the ring or the clockwise and counterclockwise modes of the ring. This was followed by the demonstration of a lithographically-fabricated photonic molecule, inspired by an analogy with a simple diatomic molecule. However, other nature-inspired PM structures (such as ‘photonic benzene’) have been proposed and shown to support confined optical modes closely analogous to the ground-state molecular orbitals of their chemical counterparts.

Photonic molecules offer advantages over isolated photonic atoms in a variety of applications, including bio(chemical) sensing, cavity optomechanics, and microlasers, Photonic molecules can also be used as quantum simulators of many-body physics and as building blocks of future optical quantum information processing networks.

In complete analogy, clusters of metal nanoparticles - which support confined surface plasmon states - have been termed ‘plasmonic molecules.”

Finally, hybrid photonic-plasmonic (or opto-plasmonic) and elastic molecules have also been proposed and demonstrated.

See also
Photoluminescence
Luminiferous aether

References

External links 
 http://prl.aps.org/abstract/PRL/v81/i12/p2582_1

Atomic physics
Particle physics